Comin-Yanga  is a department or commune of Koulpélogo Province in eastern Burkina Faso. Its capital is the town of Comin-Yanga. According to the 2019 census the department has a total population of 48,260.

Towns and villages
 Comin-Yanga (5,373 inhabitants) (capital)
 Baglenga (271 inhabitants)
 Balboudi (438 inhabitants)
 Bangoghin (350 inhabitants)
 Coewinga (463 inhabitants)
 Dogtenga (2,721 inhabitants)
 Gagare (1,672 inhabitants)
 Gaonghin (438 inhabitants)
 Kakati (1,611 inhabitants)
 Kamdiokin (1,051 inhabitants)
  (123 inhabitants)
 Kiougou-Doure (729 inhabitants)
 Kiougou-Kandaga (1,673 inhabitants)
 Kiougou-Namounou (182 inhabitants)
 Kisbouga (1,013 inhabitants)
 Kohogo (1,918 inhabitants)
 Kohogo-Peulh (61 inhabitants)
 Kolanga (450 inhabitants)
 Konzeogo-Bangane (153 inhabitants)
 Konzeogo-Sambila (1,294 inhabitants)
 Konzeogo-Yalgo (389 inhabitants)
 Lamiougou (1,720 inhabitants)
 Moaga (153 inhabitants)
 Pilede (430 inhabitants)
 Pognankoudougou-Rabogo (199 inhabitants)
 Sabrado (1,038 inhabitants)
 Sakango (1,690 inhabitants)
 Sakidissi (237 inhabitants)
 Sougoudi (276 inhabitants)
 Tanziega (147 inhabitants)
  (383 inhabitants)
 Vohogdin (5,800 inhabitants)
 Youtenga (484 inhabitants)
 Zonghin (1,502 inhabitants)

References

Departments of Burkina Faso
Koulpélogo Province